Osaka City Air Terminal (OCAT) is a multi-purpose commercial complex in Minatomachi, Naniwa-ku, Osaka housing South Osaka's inter-city bus terminal and coach ferry services to Kansai International Airport, JR Namba station and six floors of shops, restaurants, travel agencies and tourist offices. OCAT is also the venue for frequent musical performances and its outdoor Ponte Square area is the meeting place and practice area for Osaka's youthful street dance community. Urban dance competitions are held there every August. 

Despite the name of the complex, OCAT is not actually an air terminal itself but part of an extended, inter-connected underground transport hub to Kansai International Airport.  Namba Station, the terminal for south Osaka City bound train services (including Kansai International) is within 15 minutes walking distance from OCAT via the Namba Walk - an underground passageway lined with shops, bars and restaurants.

Floors
Roof: Roof Garden (closed from December to March)
6th floor: Offices
5th floor: Namba Municipal Tax Office、Restaurants, Bookstore (COMICS JUNKUDO Namba)
4th floor: Osaka Lifelong Learning Center Namba, Namba Municipal Tax Office, Airline offices, Tourist information, Fortune
3rd floor: Liquor and Imported foods (Yamaya), General stores, Relaxation
2nd floor: Bus terminal, UNICEF office
1st floor: Entrance, Fashion Mall, Post Office, Daiso
1st basement: JR Namba Station, Restaurants, Pharmacy, Convenience store, passage to Minatomachi River Place, passage to Namba Walk
3rd and 4th basement: Seijukai Medical Center

Bus terminal
Osaka Airport Transport Co., Ltd., Kansai Airport Transportation Enterprise Co., Ltd., Kintetsu Bus Co., Ltd., Nankai Bus Co., Ltd., West JR Bus Company, JR Bus Kanto Co., Ltd., JR Tokai Bus Company, Chugoku JR Bus Company, JR Shikoku Bus Company, Hankyu Bus Co., Ltd., Honshi Kaikyo Bus Co., Ltd., Nihon Kotsu Co., Ltd. (Osaka), Nihon Kotsu Co., Ltd. (Tottori), etc.
 Gates 1, 2, 3
 Sightseeing buses, Tour buses
 Gate 4
 Airport limousine for Osaka International Airport
 Flying Sneaker Osaka; for Tokyo Station
 Chuodo Hiru Tokkyu/Seishun Chuo Eco Dream; for Yaho Station, Shinjuku Station, and Tokyo Station
 Crystal Liner; for Nirasaki Station, Ryūō Station, and Kōfu Station
 Fujiyama Liner; for Higashi-Shizuoka Station, Fuji Station, Fujinomiya Station, Fuji-Q Highland, Kawaguchiko Station, and Fujisan Station
 Wakasa Liner; for Wakasa-Wada Station, Wakasa-Hongō Station, and Obama Station
 Direct Express Choku-Q Kyoto; for Katanoshi Station, Kawachi-Iwafune Station, Kyōto Station
 Direct Express Choku-Q Kyoto; for Katanoshi station, Kawachi-Iwafune Station, Matsuiyamate Station, and Kyōtanabe City Office
 Direct Express Choku-Q Kyoto; for Hotel Keihan Universal Tower
 Awa Express Osaka; for Maiko Station, and Tokushima Station
 Tropical; for Kagoshima Airport, Kagoshima-Chūō Station, and Kagoshima Port
 Gate 5
 Airport limousine for Kansai International Airport
 Dream/GranDream/Premium Dream/ Seishun Eco Dream/Tokaido Hiru Tokkyu; for Shinjuku Station, and Tokyo Station
 Dream Namba Sakai; for Shinjuku Station, and Tokyo Station
 Flying Liner; for Yokohama Station, Tokyo Station, Ueno Station, and Asakusa Station
 for Takayama Station
 for Izumiōtsu Port
 Kabutogani; for Satoshō Station, Kasaoka City Office, Ibara Station, Komoriutanosato-Takaya Station, and Kannabe
 Kure Dream Hiroshima; for Saijō Station, Hiroshima University, and Kure Station
 Awa Express Osaka; for Maiko Station, and Tokushima Station
 Kochi Express; for Kōchi Station, Harimayabashi Station, and Susaki Station
 Gate 6
 Southern Cross; for Akihabara Station, Yotsukaidō Station, Keisei Narita Station, Narita International Airport, Sawara Station, and Chōshi Station
 Southern Cross; for Odawara Station, Fujisawa Station, Kamakura Station, Ōfuna Station, and Totsuka Station
 Southern Cross; for Hashimoto Station, Akishima Station, Tachikawa Station, and Tamagawa-Jōsui Station
 Southern Cross; for Kashiwazaki Station, Nagaoka Station, and Higashi-Sanjō Station
 Southern Cross; for Nagano Station, Suzaka Station, Shinshu-Nakano Station, Iiyama Station, and Yudanaka Station
 Ryobi Express; for Okayama Station, Kurashiki Station
 Takamatsu Express Osaka; for Takamatsu Station
 Takanan Foot Bus; takamatsu Station, Kokubunji Bus Terminal
 Kochi Express; for Kōchi Station, Harimayabashi Station, and Susaki Station
 Matsuyama Express; Matsuyama City Station, Uchiko Station, Iyo-Ōzu Station, Yawatahama Station, and Yawatahama Port
 Gate 7
 Arcadia; for Nan'yō City Office, and Yamagata Station
 Forest; for Sendai Station (Miyagi)
 Galaxy; for Kōriyama Station, Fukushima Station
 Seagull; for Hitachi City Office, Takahagi Station, Isohara Station, and Iwaki Station
 Yokappe; for Tsukuba Station, Tsuchiura Station, and Mito Station
 Tochinoki; for Kuki Station, Tochigi Station, and Utsunomiya Station
 Twinkle / Casual Twinkle; for Hachiōji Station, Keiō-hachiōji Station and Shinjuku Station
 Ryobi Express/Kibi Express Osaka; for Okayama Station
 Bingo Liner; for Fukuyama Station, Fuchū, and Onomichi Station
 San'in Tokkyu Bus; for Tottori Station
 San'in Tokkyu Bus; for Kurayoshi Station
 San'in Tokkyu Bus; for Yonago Station
 Karst; for Tokuyama Station, Hōfu Station, and Hagi
 Shimanto Blue Liner; for Kubokawa Stationm Nakamura Station, and Sukumo Station
 Sunrise / Aso Kuma; for Kumamoto Station
 Holland; for Ōmura, Isahaya, Nagasaki Station
 Sorin; for Nakatsu Station, Usa, and Ōita Station
 Gate 8
 Silk Liner; for Saitama-Shintoshin Station, Ashikaga Station, Ōta Station, Kiryū Station, Isesaki Station, Takasaki Station, Shin-Maebashi Station, and Maebashi Station
 for Nishi-Maizuru Station, Higashi-Maizuru Station
 Shirahama Express Osaka; for Inami, Minabe, Haya Station, Tanabe Station, and Shirahama
 Kuniumi Liner; for Awaji, Sumoto
 for Fukuchiyama Station
 Gate 9
 for getting off
 Intercity bus departing for Higashi-Maizuru at 8:30 p.m.
 Gate 10
 Only for getting off

External links 
OCAT Official site

Bus stations in Japan
Transport in Osaka Prefecture
Buildings and structures in Osaka